You Send Me is a studio album by American musician Roy Ayers. It was released in 1978 through Polydor Records. Recording sessions for the album took place at Sigma Sound Studios and Electric Lady Studios in New York City. Production was handled by Roy Ayers and Carla Vaughn. The album features contributions from vocalists Carla Vaughn and Merry Clayton, keyboardists Philip Woo and Harry Whitaker, guitarists Chuck Anthony and James Mason, bassists William Allen and Kerry Turman, drummers Bernard Purdie, José Ortiz, Dennis Davis, Howard King and Steve Cobb, percussionist Chano O'Ferral, saxophonist Justo Almario, and trumpeter John Mosley, with guest appearances from Bruce Fisher and Stan Richardson on lead vocals, Ethel Beatty and Tony Gooden on backing vocals, and strings contractor Kermit Moore.

The album peaked at number 48 on the Billboard Top LPs chart and at number 16 on the Top Soul LPs chart in the United States. Its lead single, "Get On Up, Get On Down", reached a peak position of No. 56 on the Hot Soul Singles chart.

Track listing

Personnel 

 Roy Ayers – vocals, vibraphone (tracks: 3, 5), electric piano (tracks: 1, 2, 4), piano & cowbell (track 6), arrangement, producer
 Carla Vaughn – vocals (tracks: 1–3, 5–7), producer
 Merry Clayton – lead vocals (track 3), backing vocals (tracks: 5–7)
 Stanley Richardson – lead vocals (track 4)
 Bruce Fisher – lead vocals (track 4)
 Ethel Beatty – backing vocals (track 4)
 Tony Gooden – backing vocals (track 8)
 Philip Woo – electric piano (tracks: 1, 3, 5–8), minimoog (track 2), ARP String Synthesizer (track 5)
 Harry Whitaker – piano (track 4)
 James Philip Mason – guitar (track 3)
 Chuck Anthony – electric guitar (tracks: 4, 5)
 William Henry Allen – bass (tracks: 1, 2, 4, 7), arrangement
 Kerry Turman – bass (tracks: 3, 5, 6, 8)
 José Ortiz – drums (track 2)
 Dennis Davis – drums (track 3)
 Kwame Steve Cobb – drums (track 4)
 Howard Terrance King – drums (track 5)
 Bernard Lee "Pretty" Purdie – drums (tracks: 6, 7)
 John Sussewell – drums (track 8)
 Chano O'Ferral – congas (tracks: 1, 3, 4, 8), backing vocals (track 8)
 Justo Almario – tenor saxophone (tracks: 3, 6)
 John Clifford Mosley, Jr. – trumpet (tracks: 3, 6)
 Kermit Moore – strings (tracks: 1, 4)
 Michael Hutchinson – engineering
 Jerry Solomon – engineering
 Carla Bandini – assistant engineering
 Robert L. Heimall – design
 Joel Brodsky – photography

Charts

References

External links 

1978 albums
Roy Ayers albums
Polydor Records albums
Albums produced by Roy Ayers